Yury Mikhaylovich Khovansky (born 19 January 1990) is a Russian video blogger, comedian, rapper and former Deputy assistant to State Duma member  Vasily Vlasov.

Biography 
Yury was born in Nikolsk, Russia, 19 January 1990.

Yury was very active all his childhood, he loved playing football, staying at home, Yury spent a lot of time playing online games. Yury got interested in music when he was young and played the bass guitar in amateur rock bands.

His parents wanted him to enter the Saint Petersburg State University of Engineering and Economics after school graduation but Yury did not manage to do it. Yury entered the Saint-Petersburg State University of Economics to become a programmer after that. Although he studied only for several years, Khovansky quickly realized that this profession did not suit him and he dropped out. He made a decision to get a higher education and graduated from another university, being a straight A-student, later.

His early career has not brought him money or success. He has worked as a promoter, and a waiter, even a courier. Not feeling fulfilled, Khovansky changed his course of actions: it crossed his mind that he could create a channel on YouTube, the decision turned his world upside down.

On 9 June 2021 he was detained in St. Petersburg in a criminal case under Article 205.2 of the Criminal Code of the Russian Federation (public justification of terrorism). He pleaded guilty for all charges. On June 10, he was placed in pre-trial detention center until trial on August 8.

Internet career 
Yury uploaded the videos of foreign Stand-up comedians with his own Russian translation on the created YouTube channel in September 2011. He performed a variety of humorous songs which concerned social life and existence in his project That guy with the guitar. Yury met renowned YouTuber Ilya Maddyson (Ilya Davydov in real life), they ended up making videos together. Their collaborative works were an example of Russian modern satire which manifested the actual problems of society.

The first episode of Russian Stand-up became a new step of Yury's career, each video of that show was dedicated to current social problems or just reflections on life. His performances had a tendency to be hilarious and catchy like modern swanky tunes people heard on the radio.

Yury's ability to speak his mind without any limits attracted an enormous quantity of YouTube users who considered his humor — a new wave in modern art, pertaining to social life of the new generation. This very way of communicating with people made Khovansky extremely famous, the channel commenced gaining a lot of subscribers. Only four seasons of Russian Stand-up were released, as it was explained by Yury "he lost interest in the show quickly".

There were other shows which made Khovansky's sense of humor iconic: Lexplay, Big steaming pile of sketches, Russian Drink Time, [standing], Shawarma-Patrol. After becoming very famous Yury labeled himself as the «Emperor of humor» and strongly emphasized that he was the first Stand-up comedian on the Internet.

He is a judge in a rap battle Versus Battle in St. Petersburg. His popularity is still growing owing to his undeniable talent and a series of YouTube conflicts. The conflict with Dmitry Larin  (true surname – Utkin) ended up in a rap battle with Yury's glorious victory. After the battle Yury began to record satyric music videos in the gangster form, which gathered millions of views on YouTube. His first album My gangsta, released in 2017, caused a lot of commotion among rap singers who called it either good or extremely mediocre.

A conflict with Kirill Kalashnikov, a famous producer, broke out in summer 2017. Yury turned down Kirill's invitations and was beaten by an unnamed Kalashnikov's friend. In the police office Yury was offered to deal with Kirill himself due to having a weapon license.

Arrest and jailing 

On 10 June 2021, during the night, Yuri Khovansky was arrested and charged with supporting terrorism over the crime of singing a song which pertained to the Nord-Ost Hostage Crisis, a Chechen terrorist event in 2002, during one livestream, now recorded and uploaded to YouTube. The song's lyrics, sung by the YouTuber acoustically, satirically talks about wishing more Russian children would perish at the hands of Chechen terrorists, albeit the delivery of the song puts the content in uneasy contradiction to the light nature of its delivery. According to a criminal investigation conducted by the Main Investigative Directorate of the Investigative Committee of Russia, the courts noted that because of his on-screen performativity and glamourizing of the song, he was then supporting the "public justification of terrorism and its propaganda." For breaching Part 2 of Article 205.2 of the Criminal Code of Russia, he was given two months in incarceration. However, the song was already public and is recorded to have been on Russian YouTube one year prior.

The vlogger, after having been arrested, partially seceded to the charges against him but had asked for in-house arrest or select activities ban. The Dzerzhinsky District Court rejected his request and put him into pre-trial detention instead. They expressed alarm that if allowed to remain at home, he could continue engaging in harmful manners. The courts ruled that the song was justifying terrorism and calling for more acts to be committed.  Additionally, Khovansky's position at the State Duma as an Assistant Deputy to Russian politician Vasily Vlasov within the Liberal Democratic Party of Russia [LDPR], was quickly rescinded. This was announced in a public statement by LDPR's Press Secretary Alexander Dyupin.

Primary accuser 
The call for legal action against the YouTuber was instigated by Vladislav Pozdnyakov, founder of the Russian jingoist "Мужское государство" [Men's State] movement, the group dedicated towards the promulgation of traditionally patriarchal and conservative values. As reported by The Flow, the proceedings against Yuri began in February when Vladislav reported him to the Ministry of Internal Affairs.

On 9 June 2021 Vladislav wrote on his VKontakte page that he was proud of his followers that the "faggot" got arrested in a statement:

He continues to state that the videos of Khovansky singing the controversial song were originally uploaded to Vkontakte by the blogger Ай, Как Просто!, a hugely popular YouTuber and content creator inside of Russia who mostly talks about technology and digital culture. After having been alerted about Khovansky's videos, he assessed their provocational potency with other NKVD officers before going ahead with asking his followers to reprimand Khovansky and call for his arrest.

In the same statement, he also called out the vlogger Dmitry Larin after he made a video about Pozdnyakov in December 2020 where he went into detail about Men's State and its ideology, calling its leader a Fascist among other incendiary positions taken. As a result, Pozdnyakov promised to "punish" the YouTuber in unambiguous terminology. Further, Pozdnyakov called for his followers to closely study all of Larin's content for points of inflammation and unacceptability.

Letter about daily life 
After his incarceration, he wrote a letter to his friend Ilya Davydov about his treatment within the pre-trial detention facility. He noted that hygiene was nearly impossible and that the only books available were of low, literary quality. However, besides these factors he said that the conditions were fair. He also stated that prior to his arrest, he was a supporter of Putin. But following, he no longer supports the President.

Follow-up apology 
On 23 July 2021 The Flow reported that Yuri Khovansky had written an apology for his involvement with the song, his letter being published on VKontakte by his friend Ilya Davydov early in the morning. In the letter from his cell in pre-trial detention, Yuri apologizes for his usage of the song and to those who were offended by the song's contents and themes. He expressed his remorse for having uttered the song and scorned the song's existence. 

However, according to some commenters online, the validity of the letter should be questioned as the picture only shows his signature being handwritten, leading some to speculate on the letter's authenticity.

Further extension 
On 7 August 2021 the Kuibyshevsky District Court of St. Petersburg announced that they would be extending Khovansky's detention until 8 September. The detention was furthered due to the investigator's worry that because Khovansky has IT experience, he could delete media and evidence related to the case if released.

Release from detention
On 29 December 2021 the court released Khovansky from detention.

End of the prosecution
On 20 July 2022 the court closed Khovansky's criminal case due to the statute of limitation.

References

External links 
 Official website
 Russia's 'Traditional Values' Lawmaker Faces Online Backlash

1990 births
Living people
People from Nikolsky District, Penza Oblast
Russian stand-up comedians
Russian YouTubers
Russian rappers
Russian hip hop
Gangsta rappers
Russian comedy musicians
Russian hip hop musicians
Russian podcasters
Comedy YouTubers
Saint Petersburg University of Economics and Finance alumni
Russian conspiracy theorists
Russian video bloggers